The Design 1031 ship (full name Emergency Fleet Corporation Design 1031) was a steel-hulled tanker ship design approved for production by the United States Shipping Boards Emergency Fleet Corporation (EFT) in World War I. A total of 16 ships were ordered; 5 were cancelled and 11 were built from 1919 to 1920. Two shipyards were used in their construction: Bethlehem Wilmington Shipyard of Wilmington, Delaware (6 ships); and Terry Shipbuilding Company of Savannah, Georgia (5 ships).

References

Bibliography

External links
 EFC Design 1031 (Bethlehem): Illustrations
 EFC Design 1031 (Terry): Illustrations

Standard ship types of the United States
 
Design 1031 ships of the United States Navy
Tankers of the United States